Sir Alexander Meadows Rendel,  (3 April 1828 – 23 January 1918) was an English civil engineer.

Rendel was born in Plymouth, the eldest son of the engineer James Meadows Rendel and his wife Catherine Harris.  Three of his brothers were civil engineers: George Wightwick Rendel, Stuart Rendel, 1st Baron Rendel (who was also a Liberal MP), and Hamilton Owen Rendel.

He was educated at The King's School Canterbury and Trinity College, Cambridge.

Rendel was the engineer of the London Dock Company in 1856, and was responsible for the Shadwell Basin, the Connaught Tunnel and the Royal Albert Dock in London, the Albert and Edinburgh Docks in Leith, Workington Dock and Harbour. In 1857-1858 he visited India, and was consulting engineer to the India Office, the East India Railway and other Indian railways, and was a member of the commission to determine narrow gauge for Indian Railways, in 1870.  He designed the Lansdowne Bridge Rohri at Sukkur over the Indus River, which when it was completed in 1889 was the largest cantilever bridge in the world. The climax of his bridge-building career was considered to be the Howrah or Jubilee Bridge allowing trains to cross the Hooghly River near Calcutta; this was opened by the Viceroy on 21 February 1887 He was appointed a Knight Commander of the Order of the Indian Empire (KCIE) in 1897.

He married Eliza Hobson (1830–1916), daughter of Captain William Hobson RN, the late first Governor of New Zealand. The ceremony was held on 27 January 1853 at the Parish Church of Stoke Damerel, Devonport by the Rev James Elliot, uncle of the bride. They had five sons and three daughters, including:
Dr. Arthur B. Rendel, who married in 1902 Elizabeth Cecilia Blair, daughter of Colonel H. F. Blair, RN.

His youngest surviving brother, Hamilton Owen Rendel, designed and supervised the installation of the steam driven compound condensing pump engines, hydraulic accumulators and hydraulic machinery that first operated the bascules of the iconic Tower Bridge in London.
He was the designer of Hardinge Bridge in Bangladesh.
Alexander Rendel died at 51 Gordon Square, London, on 23 January 1918. He is buried with his family in Brookwood Cemetery.

References

1828 births
1918 deaths
Engineers from Plymouth, Devon
English civil engineers
Burials at Brookwood Cemetery